Prospekt Vernadskogo may refer to:

 Prospekt Vernadskogo District, a district of Moscow, Russia
 Prospekt Vernadskogo (Sokolnicheskaya line), a station on the Moscow Metro, Line 1
 Prospekt Vernadskogo (Bolshaya Koltsevaya line), a station on the Moscow Metro, Line 11